Puilaurens (also non-officially: Lapradelle-Puilaurens) is a commune in the Aude department in southern France.

It includes the hamlets of Lapradelle, Puilaurens and Lavignac. It is known for the medieval Puilaurens Castle.

Geography
The commune is situated on the Boulzane river and the Green Meridian.

History
The built-up area of Lapradelle did not exist until the 19th century and owes its development to activities related to water power taken from the Boulzane: textile spinning and sawmills.

In 1904, a railway was constructed from Quillan to Rivesaltes (the Carcassonne - Rivesaltes Line) passing through Lapradelle on a viaduct spanning the valley of the Boulzane. The line carried passengers until 1939. Afterwards it was used to transport feldspar between the Aude and the Pyrénées-Orientales, the railway line is today used in the summer for a tourist train, running between Axat and Rivesaltes.

In 1868, Puilaurens lost the hamlets of Salvezines and Caunil, established as the separate commune of Salvezines.

Population
Its inhabitants are called Puilaurenois.

See also
Communes of the Aude department

References

Communes of Aude
Aude communes articles needing translation from French Wikipedia